Coprosma rhamnoides (also known as twiggy coprosma or red-currant coprosma) is an endemic shrub in New Zealand.  It forms a small shrub up to 2 m tall. The leaves are very small, simple and variable in shape. The inconspicuous flowers are unisexual and believed to be wind pollinated.  It is widespread in occurrence and can be the dominant small leaved divaricating shrub in some locations

Description 
It is a dense shrub. which can sprawl over rocks.  It is typically less than 1 metre tall. with thin, divaricating branches.  This gives a distinct twiggy appearance which accounts for the common name ‘twiggy coprosma’.

The leaves are leathery and matte with a glabrous lamina which appears reticulate on the underside where it may also be pubescent.

The opposite leaves are often in bundles with very short petioles and are 7 – 12 mm long.

The leaves are variable in size and shape.  This can depend on maturity. The common broad shape leaves are orbicular. The leaves narrow quickly into the pubescent petiole.   The hairs continue onto the lower area of the leaf ).

The almost microscopic stipules at the base of the leaves are also pubescent with a sharp denticle at their apices.   
 
The branches are small, about 10mm in diameter  and numerous, which makes the shrub dense.  The branches are rigid and growing in many directions which creates the twiggy appearance.  The bark is a reddish brown colour, and when scratched, it exposes a yellow/green colour.

The flowers are small and borne in the axils. Both male and female corollas comprise four lobed petals. The male petal is 2.7mm, whereas the female is 1.3mm long  and are more narrow and funnel shaped.  The male has four stamens.

The fruit are fleshy, globose berries, of a crimson or ruby red colour distributed solitarily along the branchlets.

Geographic Distribution and habitat

Natural global range
The Coprosma rhamnoides species is endemic to New Zealand, meaning it is found nowhere else in the world apart from New Zealand

New Zealand range
The coprosma rhamnoides is found throughout all of New Zealand, from Northland to Stewart island.  Furthermore, it is common throughout, apart from a few areas.  These areas are Otago, Southland, and the Fiordlands.   Notably, the species is hardly found in coastal areas, it is far more common inland.

Habitat preferences
The coprosma rhamnoides prefers lowland areas, including the lower ranges of mountains.  The habitat preferences is around the edges of forests or in shrubland.   Furthermore, the species has a notable preference to grow as understorey vegetation of Leptospermum (Manuka) and Kunzea.  It is not common, in coastal areas, it prefers to grow far inland.  This suggests that low salinity areas, provide optimum conditions for the coprosma rhamnoides.

Life cycle/Phenology
The coprosma rhamnoides has a small seed with fleshy red berry surrounding it.  The seedlings  start to appear after two/three months   Once the shrub is grown, small flowers occur.  This would be during Spring time from September to October.  The flowers are wind pollinated.   Soon after, in November, the flowers turn into small green berries.  These red berries ripen and turn red by June the next year.   Once they are red, the berry is now ripe, and encompasses only two small seeds inside it.  The berries can remain on the shrub, and over ripen as they turn a crimson or black colour.

Environmental Conditions 
The coprosma rhamnoides species grows inland, where the surrounding conditions are low salinity.  Saline soils are not preferred by the twiggy coprosma.  Ideal soil conditions have a neutral pH for the shrub to grow.  Apart from that, this shrub is well known to be very hardy.  It can grow in the most hardy conditions, under high wind and weather exposure.   The shrub can grow in sunny or rainy environmental conditions

Predators, Parasites, and Diseases 
The coprosma rhamnoides is preyed upon by many species.  Geckos and skinks are common herbivores of the berries.  They eat the berries at night time.  Birds such as kererū, tūī, korimako (bellbird), stitchbird, and weka will eat the berries by day.  Lastly, rats will eat the berries too.

The leaves are appetising for mammals such as goats, deer or cattle.   However, as the twiggy coprosma name suggests, the twig-like structure makes it difficult for grazers to access the leaves and berries.

A slightly more adapted herbivore to the twiggy coprosma is the ‘coprosma leaf beetle’.  This species can chew holes in the young leaves.  This beetle appears around Spring time on the shrub. It can jump from leaf to leaf.   Other herbivorous insects include three native caterpillars.  These are the 
Dark Coprosma Carpet moth - Austrocidaria similata
Coprosma pug moth - Pasiphila sandycias
Pallid Coprosma leafroller - Leucotenes coprosmae
Lastly, two coprosma scale insects are herbivores of the coprosma rhamnoides.

Two gall mites are parasites of the coprosma rhamnoides and also several gall midges.  The mites can cause a discolouration in the leaves.  They make the leaves turn yellow.

Other information 
Coprosma rhamnoides is the most common small-leaved coprosma in New Zealand.  New Zealand has approximately 30 in total.

The coprosma rhamnoides is not usually grown in gardens, likely due to the scruffy and twig-like appearance. However, if it were to be cultivated, it can grow roots from semi-hardwood cuttings when placed in the ground.

See also
 Coprosma spathulata

References

 C. Michael Hogan. 2009. Crown Fern: Blechnum discolor, Globaltwitcher.com, ed. N. Stromberg
 New Zealand Institute. 1908. Transactions and Proceedings of the New Zealand Institute, Published by J. Hughes, Printer, vol. 40

rhamnoides
Flora of New Zealand
Divaricating plants